Andre the Giant Has a Posse is a street art campaign based on a design by Shepard Fairey created in 1989 while Shepard attended the Rhode Island School of Design in Providence, Rhode Island. Distributed by the skater community and graffiti artists, the stickers featuring an image of André the Giant began showing up in many cities across the United States. At the time, Fairey declared the campaign to be "an experiment in phenomenology". Over time, the artwork has been reused in a number of ways and has become worldwide. Fairey also altered the work stylistically and semantically into OBEY Giant.

History

Fairey and fellow Rhode Island School of Design student Ryan Lesser, along with Blaize Blouin, Alfred Hawkins and Mike Mongo created paper and vinyl stickers and posters with an image of the wrestler André the Giant and the text "ANDRE THE GIANT HAS A POSSE 7′ 4″, 520 lb", ("7′ 4″, 520 lbs"—2.24 m, 236 kg—famously being Andre the Giant's billed height and weight) as an in-joke directed at hip hop and skater subculture, and then began clandestinely and aggressively propagating and posting them in Providence, Rhode Island, and over the rest of the Eastern United States.

In an interview with Format magazine in 2008, Fairey said: "The Andre the Giant sticker was just a spontaneous, happy accident. I was teaching a friend how to make stencils in the summer of 1989, and I looked for a picture to use in the newspaper, and there just happened to be an ad for wrestling with André the Giant and I told him that he should make a stencil of it. He said 'Nah, I’m not making a stencil of that, that’s stupid!' but I thought it was funny so I made the stencil and I made a few stickers and the group of guys I was hanging out with always called each other The Posse, so it said Andre the Giant Has a Posse, and it was sort of appropriated from hip-hop slang – Public Enemy, N.W.A and Ice-T were all using the word."

By the early 1990s, tens of thousands of paper and then vinyl stickers were photocopied and hand-silkscreened and put in visible places throughout the world.

"Andre the Giant Has a Posse" is also the title of a 1995 documentary short by Helen Stickler, which was the first documentary to feature Shepard Fairey and chronicle his influential street art campaign. The film screened worldwide, most notably in the 1997 Sundance Film Festival. In 2003, Village Voice film critic Ed Halter described the film as: "legendary" and "a canonical study of a Gen-X media manipulation. One of the keenest examinations of '90s underground culture".

The threat of a lawsuit from Titan Sports, Inc. in 1994 spurred Fairey to stop using the trademarked name André the Giant, and to create a more iconic image of the wrestler's face, now most often with the equally iconic branding OBEY. The "OBEY" slogan was not only a parody of propaganda, but also a direct homage to the "OBEY" signs found in the cult film, They Live (1988), starring Roddy Piper. About "OBEY", San Diego Union-Tribune art critic Robert L. Pincus said: "[Fairey's work] was a reaction against earlier political art, since it delivered no clear message. Still, 'Obey' was suggestively antiauthoritarian." "Following the example set by gallery art, some street art is more about the concept than the art," writes The Walrus contributor Nick Mount. "'Fuck Bush' isn’t an aesthetic; it’s an ethic. Shepard Fairey’s Obey Giant stickers and Akay's Akayism posters are clever children of Duchamp, ironic conceptual art."

Appropriation and fair use 

Fairey has come under criticism for appropriating others' artwork. Graphic designer Baxter Orr did his own take on Fairey's work: a piece called Protect, with the iconic Obey Giant face covered by a SARS (respiratory) mask. He started selling prints, marked as his own work, through his website. On April 23, 2008, Orr received a signed cease-and-desist order from Fairey's attorneys, telling him to pull Protect from sale because they alleged it violated Fairey's trademark. Fairey threatened to sue, calling the designer a "bottom feeder" and "parasite".

Parodies

The original "Andre the Giant Has a Posse" sticker format has been widely imitated for humorous effect over many years. In these parody stickers, the image of André the Giant has been replaced with a similarly stylized black-and-white photo of some other person or character, along with the new figure's height and weight.

For example, the parody sticker "Tattoo the Midget Has a Bigger Posse" features the image of Hervé Villechaize portraying the character Tattoo from Fantasy Island. Colin Purrington's "Charles Darwin Has a Posse" stickers, featuring a black-and-white photo of Charles Darwin, promote the theory of evolution. During the 2000 presidential campaign in the United States, "Ralph Nader Has a Posse" showed up on college campuses. Numerous other parody stickers can be found featuring different popular culture figures, including the Homestar Runner character Strong Mad.

Another parody of the "Obey" poster has an image of Henry David Thoreau and reads "Disobey" in reference to his essay Civil Disobedience.These parody stickers are a further extension of the original "joke", and thus are most likely to be found in locations where the original André the Giant iconography is already familiar, such as SoHo, Manhattan, or South Street, Philadelphia. An unusual occurrence of a parody sticker was at the particle physics laboratory Fermilab where the director of the lab, Pier Oddone, was the subject of the sticker.

Tenacious D produced stickers with the slogan "Obey the D" and stylized images of their members, Jack Black and Kyle Gass, over their initials. Guitar Hero II features a "Vlad Has a Posse" sticker on various loading screens throughout the game. Electronic Frontier Foundation created a sticker with the words "Fair Use Has a Posse" on it. "Joey Deacon Has a Posse" parody stencils have appeared in the United Kingdom.

"Jack Has a Posse" stickers have appeared in the Gaslamp Quarter of San Diego, California, in July 2011 during the Esri International User Conference held at the nearby San Diego Convention Center. The stickers carry an image of US businessman Jack Dangermond, founder of Esri.

ThinkGeek produced a T-shirt with the slogan "Fezzik Has a Posse" in March 2012, in reference to André the Giant's role as Fezzik in the movie The Princess Bride (1987) and the "Andre the Giant Has a Posse" street art campaign.

In 2014, WWE wrestler Daniel Bryan started wearing a T-shirt with a stylized image of himself with a "YES" slogan at the bottom.

Also in 2014, a rash of "Aleister Crowley has a Posse" stickers appeared around New York City and Chicago.

New York Mets pitcher Bartolo Colón has also been the subject of a line of parody stickers spread around the country in 2016.

The cover of the April 2017 issue of Harper's Magazine features a photo of a protester with a sign parodying the "Obey" poster with a stylized portrait of President Donald Trump and the slogan "Disobey".

The hacker community has embraced the meme with a black and white image of Grace Hopper with the words "Grace Hopper HAS A POSSE".

See also

 Guerrillero Heroico
 Culture jamming
 Graffiti
 Pop art
 Schwa (art)
 Sticker art
 Obey (clothing)

References

Further reading
 E Pluribus Venom by Shepard Fairey (2008) Gingko Press.
 Philosophy of Obey (Obey Giant): The Formative Years (1989 - 2008), edited by Sarah Jaye Williams (2008), Nerve Books UK.
 Obey: Supply & Demand, The Art of Shepard Fairey'' by Shepard Fairey (2006), Gingko Press.

External links
 Official Obey Giant Website
 TheGiant.Org - The Definitive Obey Giant Site
 Salon Interview with Shepard Fairey
 Filmed Interview with Shepard Fairey (Obey)

Culture jamming
Graffiti and unauthorised signage
Stickers
Works by Shepard Fairey
André the Giant

da:OBEY